Balli Qeshlaq (also Romanized as Bāllī Qeshlāq and Bālī Qeshlāq; also known as Ātmeyān and Āt Meyān) is a village in Qeshlaq Rural District, in the Central District of Ahar County, East Azerbaijan Province, Iran. At the 2006 census, its population was 453, in 100 families.

References 

Populated places in Ahar County